Fashion Week Cleveland is an annual fashion industry event held in Cleveland, Ohio which began in 2002.  It is one of fourteen internationally recognized fashion week events in North America.  Fashion Week Cleveland is held during the first week of May.

The event is the third-largest fashion show of its kind in the United States behind only New York Fashion Week and Los Angeles Fashion Week.  As such, this event is recognized as the showcase for emerging American fashion designers.  Designers such as MoMo Falana (designer for Sex and the City) and Wendy Pepper have been featured in past events.

References

Culture of Cleveland
Fashion events in the United States
Recurring events established in 2002
2002 establishments in Ohio
Tourist attractions in Cleveland
Fashion weeks